Alluwamna was a king of the Hittites (Middle Kingdom) in the 15th century BC. He might be a successor of Telipinu as his son-in-law, after the reign of Tahurwaili.

Family 
The wife of Alluwamna was called Harapšeki. Her father was Telipinu.
The son of Alluwamna, who later became a king, was Hantili II.

Reign 
Alluwamna's reign is attested by a seal (SBo I.86) named the Tabarna seal.
As a son-in-law of Telepinu (married to his first-rank daughter Harapšeki), Alluwamna would have been first in line for the throne. However, Telepinu banished him and his wife to Malitashkur (see KUB 26:77), and so it is possible that he did not come to the throne right after Telepinu's death, but rather after the reign of Tahurwaili, first cousin of Telipinu 
One text of Alluwamna records the granting of land to his son and likely successor Hantili II.

See also

History of the Hittites

External links
Reign of Alluwamna

Sources

Hittite kings
15th-century BC rulers